Walter T. Morgan (born May 31, 1941) is an American professional golfer who has played on the Senior PGA Tour (now Champions Tour).

Morgan was born in Haddock, Georgia, where he played baseball in his youth. He served 20 years in the United States Army including two tours of duty in Vietnam. He began playing golf at the age of 30 after 10 years in the military. After retiring from the military, Morgan joined the Champions Tour. He played on the tour from 1991 to 2004, winning three times.

Morgan holds or shares several Champions Tour records. He shares the lowest 18-hole round (60), lowest strokes to par score (11), and the record for the largest lead in a tournament after 18 holes with several other golfers. Morgan is also the holder of the youngest golfer to shoot his age or better record. He was eventually forced to retire from the game in 2004 for health reasons due to arthritis in his back and shoulders.

Morgan has received several Champions Tour awards. He received the 1995 Comeback Player of the Year award, and was Champions Tour Player of the Month in September 1995 and March 1996. He was also the recipient of the 2006 African-American Legend of Golf award.

Morgan and his wife, Geraldine, founded a First Tee chapter, The First Tee of Lake Norman Region, a non-profit organization that develops and supports programs promoting life skills and opportunities including the incorporation of junior golf programs for disadvantaged and special needs youth.

Professional wins (4)

Senior PGA Tour wins (3)

Senior PGA Tour playoff record (1–0)

Other senior wins (1)
2002 Uniting Fore Care Classic (Georgia-Pacific Grand Champions event)

References

External links

American male golfers
African-American golfers
PGA Tour Champions golfers
Golfers from Georgia (U.S. state)
People from Jones County, Georgia
1941 births
Living people
20th-century African-American sportspeople